Madeira (the Portuguese word for wood), officially named the Autonomous Region of Madeira (Região Autónoma da Madeira), is one of the two autonomous regions of Portugal (along with the Azores); it is an archipelago situated in the north Atlantic Ocean, southwest of mainland Portugal.

Madeira may also refer to:

Geography
 Madeira, Ohio, a city in the United States
 Madeira Beach, Florida, an American city
 Madeira evergreen forests, a wooded area covering the archipelago of Madeira and some nearby islands 
 Madeira Island, the largest of the Madeira group of islands in the Atlantic Ocean
 Madeira Park, an unincorporated community in British Columbia, Canada
 Madeira River, one of the tributaries of the Amazon River in South America

People
 George Madeira (1836–1922), a mining engineer and mineralogist who founded the first astronomical observatory in California
 Jamila Madeira (born 1975), a Portuguese socialist politician and Member of the European Parliament
 Phil Madeira (born 1952), an American songwriter, producer, musician and singer from Nashville, Tennessee

Arts, entertainment, and media
 Have Some Madeira M'Dear, a darkly comic song by Flanders and Swann
 Madeira, the fictionalized name of Debra Newell's interior design firm in the Bravo TV series, Dirty John
 Miss Madeira, a 2011 novel by Austin Gary
 RTP Madeira, a Portuguese TV channel

Food and wine
 Madeira cake, an old English cake
 Madeira wine, a fortified wine made on the island of Madeira

Schools
 Madeira School, a private girls' school in the state of Virginia, in the United States
 Universidade da Madeira, a public university in Madeira

Other uses
 C.F. União, an association football club commonly known as União da Madeira
 Madeira (shipwreck), a schooner-barge which sank on the north shore of Lake Superior in November 1905
 Madeira Airport
 Madeira Andebol SAD, a Portuguese handball club

See also
Madera (disambiguation)